Events from the year 1905 in Italy.

Kingdom of Italy
Monarch – Victor Emmanuel III (1900–1946)
Prime Minister – 
 Giovanni Giolitti (1903–1905)
 Tommaso Tittoni (1905)
 Alessandro Fortis (1905–1906)
Population – 33,489,000

Events

February
 February – Prime Minister Giovanni Giolitti brings a bill to the Chamber of Deputies for the nationalization of the railways that makes it a crime to stop or disturb railway service. The railway unions order a slowdown.

March
 March 5 – Pleading illness Giolitti resigns over the issue of national railways.
 March 12 – An interim government under Tommaso Tittoni takes over.
 March 28 – On the recommendation of Giolitti, Alessandro Fortis forms a new government, he is the first Jewish Prime Minister of Italy. The government undertakes the nationalization of the railways, after confronting a railroad strike in April that could have paralyzed transportation in the country. Railroad workers became public employees, which deprives them of the right to strike.

April
 April – The Italian government acquired control (from a private Italian company called SACI) of the coastal area around Mogadishu, and creates the colony of Italian Somaliland.
 April 17 – Railroad workers go on strike on the eve of the presentation of the new railway bill to the Italian Chamber of Deputies.
 April 22 – The strike of railway workers ends with an agreement over arbitration between the government and railroad men.

June
 June 11 – Pope Pius X promulgates the encyclical Il fermo proposito, which establishes Azione Cattolica as a non-political lay organization under the direct control of bishops. It was established after an earlier similar organization, Opera dei Congressi was disbanded in 1904 because many of its members were siding with modernism. Catholics were allowed by the Pope to vote "to help the maintenance of the social order".

July
 July 1 – The three principal railway companies in Italy are brought together with a number of private operators into the nationalised Ferrovie dello Stato.

September
 September 8 – An earthquake strikes southern Italy with a magnitude of 7.2, damaging parts of Lipari Island and Messina Province, and killing between 557 and 2,500 people. The earthquake particularly affects the Calabria region, destroying as many as 25 villages, and 14,000 homes. Fortis visited the area and introduced a special law to aid these southern regions. This measure was the first real acknowledgment by the Italian state of the fundamental problems underlying southern underdevelopment.

December
 December 3 – Foreign Minister Tittoni resigns over his proposal to reduce the duty on Spanish wine in connection with an Italo-Spanish commercial treaty that created turmoil among the rural classes.
 December 17 – The government of Prime Minister Fortis resigns the proposal to reduce the duty on Spanish wine in connection with an Italo-Spanish commercial treaty.
 December 23 – Fortis forms a new government, without Tittoni.

Births
 January 8 – Giacinto Scelsi, Italian composer (d. 1988)
 February 1 – Emilio G. Segrè, Italian physicist, Nobel Prize laureate (d. 1989)
 April 13 – Bruno Rossi, Italian experimental physicist (d. 1993)
 May 5 - Maria Caniglia, Italian operatic soprano (d. 1979)
 September 15 – Bernardo Mattarella, Italian politician (d. 1971)
 October 15 - Bruna Castagna, Italian operatic mezzo-soprano (d. 1983)

Deaths
 June 18 – Carmine Crocco, Italian brigand and folk hero (b. 1830)
 August 31 – Francesco Tamagno, Italian opera singer (b. 1850)
 September 14 – Pierre Savorgnan de Brazza, Franco-Italian explorer (b. 1852)

References

 Ashley, Susan A. (2003). Making Liberalism Work: The Italian Experience, 1860-1914, Westport (CT): Praeger Publishers, 
 Clark, Martin (2008). Modern Italy: 1871 to the present, Harlow: Pearson Education, 

 
Italy
Years of the 20th century in Italy